Tim Draxl (born 8 October 1981) is an Australian actor and singer, known for his role as Doctor Henry Fox in A Place to Call Home.

Early life 
Draxl was born in Sydney and grew up in Jindabyne where his family was in the ski industry. He also spent winters in Austria. He attended high school at the McDonald College of Performing Arts.  Draxl is openly gay.

Career 
Draxl's film roles include Swimming Upstream (2003), In My Sleep (2010) and A Few Best Men (2011).  He was nominated for a Logie Award for Most Outstanding Actor in 2004 for the ABC miniseries The Shark Net. Other television roles include in Supernova, Tangle, Serangoon Road, Mrs Biggs, Molly and A Place to Call Home.

Draxl has been referred to as "easily our [Australia's] best cabaret artist" His performance Tim Draxl in Concert was nominated for a Helpmann Award for Best Live Music Presentation in 2002.

Filmography

Films

TV

Discography

Albums

Awards

Mo Awards
The Australian Entertainment Mo Awards (commonly known informally as the Mo Awards), were annual Australian entertainment industry awards. They recognise achievements in live entertainment in Australia from 1975 to 2016.
 (wins only)
|-
| 1998
| Tim Draxl
| Johnny O'Keefe Encouragement Award
| 
|-

References

External links
 

1981 births
Living people
Australian male television actors
Australian male film actors
Australian gay actors
Male actors from Sydney